Colossopus is a genus of bush crickets in the tribe Euconchophorini, belonging to the 'conehead' subfamily Conocephalinae. This genus is endemic to Madagascar.

Species
The Orthoptera Species File lists:
Colossopus grandidieri Saussure, 1899 - type species
Colossopus parvicavus Ünal & Beccaloni, 2017
Colossopus redtenbacheri Brongniart, 1897

References 

Conocephalinae
Tettigoniidae genera